March 2012

See also

References

 03
March 2012 events in the United States